Lizette Faith Cabrera (born 19 December 1997) is an Australian tennis player of Filipino descent. She has a career-high singles ranking of No. 119, achieved on 3 February 2020.

Early life
Cabrera was born and raised in Townsville by her parents Ronnie and Maria before moving to Brisbane to train at the National Academy. She has one sister, Izabo and one brother, Carl. Cabrera's parents are both from the Philippines and both work in an abattoir in order to financially support her career.

Professional career

2016
Cabrera started 2016 with a ranking of 1062. She won her first title on the professional tour in September 2016. Her year-end singles ranking was No. 257.

2017: Maiden tour match win
Cabrera was given a wildcard into the Hobart International and won her first WTA Tour match against Misaki Doi in round one. At the Australian Open, Cabrera made her senior Grand Slam main-draw debut thanks to a wildcard; however, she lost in the first round to Donna Vekic.
In September, Cabrera qualified for and made the quarterfinals of the Guangzhou International, defeating world No. 30, Anett Kontaveit, in the second round. She ended 2017 with a singles rank of 135.

2018
Cabrera lost to Beatriz Haddad Maia in round one of the Hobart International and the Australian Open the following week. In March, she reached the quarterfinal of ACT Clay Court International. In April, Cabrera qualified for the WTA Tour event Copa Colsanitas. In May, she reached the second round of qualifying for the French Open and in June, the second round of qualifying for Wimbledon. Cabrera made her US Open main-draw debut after winning a wildcard. She lost to Ajla Tomljanović in the first round, and ended season with a singles rank of 230.

2019
Cabrera failed to qualify for the Brisbane International and Australian Open but then reached the quarterfinal of the Burnie International. In March, she played in the ITF Circuit across the U.S., with limited success, before travelling to Europe in May. She won the doubles title in Caserta, Italy with Julia Grabher and reached the quarterfinals of the Manchester Trophy, losing to eventual champion Magda Linette.

In July, Cabrera won the Challenger de Granby in Canada; this was her first title in three years and biggest to date. Her ranking improved to back inside the world's top 200. At the US Open, Cabrera lost in the final round of qualifying. In September, she returned to Australia and won the singles and doubles at the Darwin International. In October, she won the Bendigo International and reached the final of the Playford International the following week. These results vaulted Cabrera to a career-high ranking of 131, surpassing her previous best of 134 set in October 2017. She finished the year with a singles rank of 131.

2020
Cabrera commenced new season with her first WTA quarterfinal since 2017 at the Hobart International but lost to Elena Rybakina. She also lost in the first round at the Australian Open. She reached the quarterfinal at the Burnie International. After these results Cabrera reached a new career-high singles ranking of 119, on 3 February 2020.

2022
Cabrera reached the second round of qualifying at the Australian Open.

Performance timeline

Only main-draw results in WTA Tour, Grand Slam tournaments, Fed Cup/Billie Jean King Cup and Olympic Games are included in win–loss records.

Singles
Current after the 2023 Australian Open.

ITF Circuit finals

Singles: 9 (6 titles, 3 runner–ups)

Doubles: 9 (4 titles, 5 runner–ups)

Notes

References

External links
 
 
 

1997 births
Living people
Australian female tennis players
Tennis players from Brisbane
Sportspeople from Townsville
Australian people of Filipino descent
Australian sportspeople of Asian descent
Sportspeople of Filipino descent